Berkeley County is a county in the U.S. state of South Carolina. As of the 2020 census, its population was 229,861. Its county seat is Moncks Corner. After two previous incarnations of Berkeley County, the current county was created in 1882. Berkeley County is included in the Charleston-North Charleston, SC Metropolitan Statistical Area.

History
Berkeley County was established in 1682.  It was named after John and William Berkeley, co-owners of the Province of Carolina.  It became part of the Charleston District in 1769.  It did not exist as a District during most of the 19th century and generally was part of the Low Country culture.  In 1882, after Democrats regained control of the state legislature following the Reconstruction era, they established the current incarnation of Berkeley County, with its seat at Mount Pleasant.  The county seat was moved in 1895 to Moncks Corner.

The Old Berkeley County Courthouse was listed on the National Register of Historic Places in 1971.

Geography

National protected areas
 Francis Marion National Forest (part)

State and local protected areas/sites 
 Bonneau Ferry Wildlife Management Area
 Canal Wildlife Management Area
 Cypress Gardens
 Hatchery Wildlife Management Area
 Old Santee Canal Park
 Site of Francis Marion Tomb
 Wee Tee Wildlife Management Area (part)

Major water bodies 
 Cooper River
 Goose Creek Reservoir
 Lake Marion
 Lake Moultrie
 Santee River
 Wambaw Creek
 Wando River

Adjacent counties 
 Georgetown County - east
 Williamsburg County - northeast
 Clarendon County - north
 Orangeburg County - northwest
 Dorchester County - west
 Charleston County - south

Major highways

Major infrastructure 
 Seed Orchard Helibase

Demographics

2020 census

As of the 2020 United States census, there were 229,861 people, 80,640 households, and 57,117 families residing in the county.

2010 census
At the 2010 census, there were 177,843 people, 65,419 households, and 47,141 families living in the county. The racial makeup of the county was 66.5% white, 25.0% black or African American, 2.3% Asian, 0.6% American Indian, 0.1% Pacific islander, 2.8% from other races, and 2.7% from two or more races. Those of Hispanic or Latino origin made up 6.0% of the population.

Of the 65,419 households, 38.0% had children under the age of 18 living with them, 51.3% were married couples living together, 15.3% had a female householder with no husband present, 27.9% were non-families, and 22.0% of households were made up of individuals. The average household size was 2.66 and the average family size was 3.10. The median age was 34.5 years.

The median household income was $50,777 and the median family income  was $56,869. Males had a median income of $40,534 versus $30,997 for females. The per capita income for the county was $22,865. About 9.9% of families and 12.6% of the population were below the poverty line, including 18.2% of those under age 18 and 10.3% of those age 65 or over.

2000 census
At the 2000 census there were 142,651 people, 49,922 households, and 37,691 families living in the county.  The population density was 130 people per square mile (50/km2).  There were 54,717 housing units at an average density of 50 per square mile (19/km2).  The racial makeup of the county was 68.00% White, 26.63% Black or African American, 0.52% Native American, 1.87% Asian, 0.08% Pacific Islander, 1.20% from other races, and 1.70% from two or more races.  2.76% of the population were Hispanic or Latino of any race. 16.4% were of American, 10.0% German, 8.4% Irish and 7.7% English ancestry according to Census 2000.
Of the 49,922 households 39.20% had children under the age of 18 living with them, 56.70% were married couples living together, 14.20% had a female householder with no husband present, and 24.50% were non-families. 19.40% of households were one person and 5.60% were one person aged 65 or older.  The average household size was 2.75 and the average family size was 3.15.

The age distribution was 28.00% under the age of 18, 11.70% from 18 to 24, 31.20% from 25 to 44, 21.20% from 45 to 64, and 7.90% 65 or older.  The median age was 32 years. For every 100 females, there were 103.20 males.  For every 100 females age 18 and over, there were 102.20 males.

The median household income was $39,908 and the median family income  was $44,242. Males had a median income of $31,583 versus $22,420 for females. The per capita income for the county was $16,879.  About 9.70% of families and 11.80% of the population were below the poverty line, including 15.60% of those under age 18 and 12.90% of those age 65 or over.

Government and politics
As of 2022

Current County Administrator: Johnny Cribb
County Council:
 District 1: Vacant (due to death of sitting council member)
 District 2: Josh Whitley
 District 3: Phillip Obie, II
 District 4: Tommy Newell
 District 5: Brandon Cox
 District 6: Jack Schurlknight
 District 7: Caldwell Pinckney, Jr.
 District 8: Steve Davis
 Berkeley County Sheriff: S. Duane Lewis
 Berkeley County Coroner: George Oliver

In 2020, Joe Biden received 43.3% of the vote, the best performance for a Democrat since Jimmy Carter in 1976.

Education
All of the county is in the Berkeley County School District.

Attractions 
 Cypress Gardens, SC
 Mepkin Abbey
 Berkeley County Museum and Heritage Center

Communities

Cities
 Charleston (mostly in Charleston County)
 Goose Creek (largest city)
 Hanahan
 North Charleston (partly in Dorchester County and Charleston County)

Towns
 Bonneau
 Jamestown
 Moncks Corner (county seat)
 St. Stephen
 Summerville (partly in Dorchester County and Charleston County)

Census-designated places
 Bonneau Beach
 Ladson (partly in Charleston County, partly in Dorchester County)
 Pimlico
 Pinopolis
 Russellville
 Sangaree

Unincorporated communities
 Cross
 Gumville
 Huger
 Pineville
 Pringletown
 Cane Bay, South Carolina

See also
 List of counties in South Carolina
 National Register of Historic Places listings in Berkeley County, South Carolina
 List of national forests of the United States
 Wassamasaw Tribe of Varnertown Indians, state-recognized tribe that resides in the county

References

External links

 
 
 Berkeley County history and images

 
Charleston–North Charleston–Summerville metropolitan area
1882 establishments in South Carolina
Populated places established in 1882